Apache Calcite is an open source framework for building databases and data management systems. It includes a SQL parser, an API for building expressions in relational algebra, and a query planning engine.
As a framework, Calcite does not store its own data or metadata, but instead allows external data and metadata to be accessed by means of plug-ins.

Several other Apache projects use Calcite.
Hive uses Calcite for cost-based query optimization;
Drill and Kylin use Calcite for SQL parsing and optimization;
Samza and Storm use Calcite for streaming SQL.
, Apex, Phoenix and Flink have projects under development that use Calcite.

References

Relational database management systems
Calcite
Software using the Apache license
Free software programmed in Java (programming language)